Dominic Jentsch  (born 20 November 1991) is a German  professional  pool player. In 2006 he reached the final of the Under 17 European championships in 9-Ball.  Two years later, he was again runner-up at the 2008 European championships, this time in the age group this time for straight pool, for under 19s.

Jentsch's biggest success so far was reaching the last 16 at the World Straight Pool Championship in 2008 before losing 38–200 against Nick van den Berg. He won his first Euro Tour event at the 2012 Treviso Open.

Jentsch is a three-time German champion, winning the 8-ball national championship in 2009 and 2012, and 9-ball in 2010. At the 2011 European Pool Championships, Jentsch won his first European championship in 8-ball, through a final victory over  Ralf Souquet. The following season, at the 2012 European Pool Championships he won the event for a second time, winning the 10-Ball event through an 8–5 win over Stephan Cohen.

Titles
 2011 European Pool Championship 8-Ball
 2012 European Pool Championship 10-Ball
 2012 Euro Tour Italy Open

References

External links 

1991 births
People from Dachau
Sportspeople from Upper Bavaria
German pool players
Living people